The National Hairdressers' Federation is a trade industry group representing hairdressing salon owners in the United Kingdom.

Structure
It has 12 regions, with up to six branches within each region:

 London & Home Counties
 Eastern Counties
 North East
 South West
 Southern
 Central England
 East Midlands
 North West
 Yorkshire
 East of Scotland
 West of Scotland
 Wales

External links
NHF Website
Denman Brush

Organisations based in Bedford
Organizations established in 1942
Hairdressing
Trade associations based in the United Kingdom
1942 establishments in the United Kingdom